Nemčiňany is a village and municipality in Zlaté Moravce District of the Nitra Region, in western-central Slovakia.

History
In historical records the village was first mentioned in 1232.

Geography
The municipality lies at an altitude of 212 metres and covers an area of 15.683 km². It has a population of about 750 people.

Pictures

References

Villages and municipalities in Zlaté Moravce District